Bela may refer to:

Places

Asia
Bela Pratapgarh, a town in Pratapgarh District, Uttar Pradesh, India
Bela, a small village near Bhandara, Maharashtra, India
Bela, another name for the biblical city Zoara
Bela, Dang, in Nepal
Bela, Janakpur, in Nepal
Bela, Pakistan, a town in Balochistan, Pakistan

Europe
Bela, Vidin Province, a village in Bulgaria
Bela, Varaždin County, a village in Croatia
Bělá (disambiguation), places in the Czech Republic
River Bela, in Cumbria, England
Bela (Epirus), a medieval fortress and bishopric in Epirus, Greece
Bela, a village administered by Pucioasa town, Dâmboviţa County, Romania
Belá (disambiguation), places in Slovakia
Bela, Ajdovščina, Slovenia
Bela, Kamnik, Slovenia

People
Béla (given name), Hungarian name
Béla of Hungary (disambiguation), any of five kings of Hungary to bear that name
 Bela (or Belah), the name of three Biblical figures, including
 Bela ben Beor, king of Edom
 Bela of Saint Omer (died 1258), Crusader lord of one half of Thebes
 Bela B (born 1962), German musician
 Jacques de Bela (1586–1667), French-Basque lawyer and writer
 Jean Philippe de Bela (1703–1796), French-Basque military figure and writer
 Leila Bela, Iranian-American avant-garde musician
 Jérémie Bela (born 1993), French footballer

Arts, entertainment, and media

Fictional entities
 Bela (comics), a Marvel Comics character
 Bela, a female character in Lermontov's novel A Hero of Our Time
 Bela Talbot, a character in the third season of the television series Supernatural

Games
 Bela, a declaration in the card game belote
 Bela (card game), a trick-taking card game, better known as Klaberjass

Biology
 Bela (gastropod), a genus of sea snails
 Bela, the fruit of the tree Aegle marmelos

Organizations
Bangladesh Environmental Lawyers Association (BELA)
 BESLA, formerly known as the Black Entertainment Lawyers Association (BELA)

Other uses
 Bela Biscuit, a tea biscuit from Chittagong, Bangladesh
 BELA, the stock symbol for the Greek company Jumbo S.A.

See also
Belah
Bijela (disambiguation)
Bella (disambiguation)